This is a list of rivers in French Guiana.

By drainage basin
This list is arranged by drainage basin, with respective tributaries indented under each larger stream's name.

Atlantic Ocean
Oyapock
Camopi
Yaloupi
Approuague
Arataï
Mahury (Oyak, Comté)
Orapu
Rivière de Cayenne (Rivière des Cascades)
Tonnegrande
Montsinéry
Kourou
Sinnamary
Koursibo 
Counamama
Iracoubo
Mana
Kokioko
Arouani
Maroni
Lawa
Grand Abounami
Inini
Tampok
Waki (Ouaqui)
Litani
Malani (Marouini)
Wanapi

See also
List of rivers of the Americas by coastline

References
Rand McNally, The New International Atlas, 1993.
 GEOnet Names Server
GéoPortail (in French)

External links
  - Topographic map of French Guinana.
 

 
Rivers of French Guiana